Wrightsman is an English surname. Notable people with the surname include:

Charles Bierer Wrightsman (1895–1986), American oil executive and art collector
Jayne Wrightsman (1919–2019), American philanthropist and art collector
Stan Wrightsman (1910–1975), American jazz pianist

English-language surnames